is a railway station located in the city of Kitakami, Iwate Prefecture, Japan, operated by the East Japan Railway Company (JR East).

Lines
Wakasennin Station is served by the Kitakami Line, and is located 20.3 km from the terminus of the line at Kitakami Station.

Station layout
The station has a single island platform connected to the station building by a level crossing. The station is unattended.

Platforms

History
Wakasennin Station opened on November 18, 1921 as a station on the now-defunct Yokoguro Line. With the construction of Yuda Dam in late 1962, the line was re-routed to become part of the Kitakami Line. The station was absorbed into the JR East network upon the privatization of the Japan National Railways (JNR) on April 1, 1987. A new station building was completed in 1999.

Surrounding area

See also
 List of railway stations in Japan

References

External links

 

Railway stations in Iwate Prefecture
Kitakami Line
Railway stations in Japan opened in 1921
Kitakami, Iwate
Stations of East Japan Railway Company